Michaela Ewuraba Boakye-Collinson (born 1 October 1987), known professionally as Michaela Coel, is a British screenwriter and actress. She is best known for creating and starring in the E4 sitcom Chewing Gum (2015–2017), for which she won the BAFTA Award for Best Female Comedy Performance; and the BBC One/HBO comedy-drama series I May Destroy You (2020) for which she won the British Academy Television Award for Best Actress in 2021. For her work on I May Destroy You, Coel was the first black woman to win the Emmy Award for Outstanding Writing for a Limited Series, Movie, or Dramatic Special at the 73rd Primetime Emmy Awards.

Coel is also known for her work in other Netflix productions, including guest-starring in the series Black Mirror (2016–2017), starring as Kate Ashby in the series Black Earth Rising (2018) and as Simone in the film Been So Long (2018).

Early life
Michaela Ewuraba Boakye-Collinson was born in East London. Her parents are Ghanaian. She and her sister were raised by their mother in East London, primarily Hackney and Tower Hamlets, . She attended Catholic schools in East London, and has said that, during primary school, she bullied other pupils, claiming it was caused by her isolation as the only black pupil in her age cohort. The isolation did not continue into her secondary education at a comprehensive school.

From 2007 to 2009, Coel attended the University of Birmingham, studying English Literature and Theology. She took a Ché Walker masterclass after meeting Walker at open mic nights. In 2009, she transferred to the Guildhall School of Music and Drama, where she was the first black woman enrolled in five years. She won the Laurence Olivier Bursary Award, which helped her fund her schooling. During her time at Guildhall, Coel attended the Mark Proulx workshop at Prima del Teatro and took the Kat Francois Poetry Course at the Theatre Royal Stratford East. She graduated from the Guildhall School of Music and Drama in 2012.

Career

Beginnings 
In 2006, Coel began performing at poetry open mics in Ealing. As she continued to do open mics, she was encouraged by actor, playwright and director Ché Walker, who saw her perform at the Hackney Empire, to apply to Guildhall. As a poet, Coel performed on many stages, including Wembley Arena, Bush Theatre, Nuyorican Poets Cafe and De Doelen, Rotterdam. She went by the name Michaela The Poet.

Coel joined the Talawa Theatre Company summer school program TYPT in 2009. During her time at Talawa, Coel was in the TYPT 2009 production of Krunch, directed by Amani Naphtali. That same year, Coel released an album entitled Fixing Barbie, which featured her work as a poet and musician. In 2011, Coel released the record We're the Losers.

Coel's play Chewing Gum Dreams was her senior graduation project at Guildhall in 2012. The play was first produced at The Yard Theatre in Hackney Wick. The play featured Coel in a one-woman show telling the dramatic story of a 14-year-old girl named Tracey. The play then went on to be produced by the Bush Theatre (2012), Royal Theatre Holland (2012), Royal Exchange Theatre (2013) and the National Theatre (2014). It received positive reviews.

Early work and breakthrough (2013–2019) 
In 2013, Coel appeared in Channel 4 drama Top Boy and has had leading roles at the National Theatre, including the award-nominated Home and the critically acclaimed Medea.

Channel 4 announced that Coel would write and star in a new sitcom called Chewing Gum, inspired by her play Chewing Gum Dreams in August 2014. "C4 Comedy Blaps" were released as teasers in September 2014, and the series began on E4 in October 2015. Her performance earned her the British Academy Television Award for Best Female Comedy Performance in 2016. She also won a BAFTA for Breakthrough Talent for writing the show. Chewing Gum received overwhelmingly positive reviews.

In 2015, Coel appeared in BBC One drama London Spy. The following year, she played Lilyhot in the E4 sci-fi comedy-drama The Aliens, which was filmed in Bulgaria.

Chewing Gum returned for a second series in January 2017. She also appeared in both the "Nosedive" and "USS Callister" episodes of Charlie Brooker's series Black Mirror. Coel also had a small role in the 2017 film Star Wars: The Last Jedi.

In 2018, Coel starred in Black Earth Rising, a co-production between BBC Two and Netflix, where she played Kate, the main character. She also starred as Simone in the musical-drama film Been So Long, by Che Walker, based on his own stage play, which was released on Netflix to positive reviews in October 2018.

Critical acclaim (2020–present) 
Coel created, wrote, produced, co-directed and starred in the comedy-drama series I May Destroy You, inspired by her own experience of sexual assault. The show launched on BBC One in the UK and HBO in the US in June 2020 to widespread acclaim. She acknowledged refusing $1 million from Netflix after the streaming service declined to offer her intellectual property ownership of her show.

In 2020, Coel was included in Times 100 Most Influential People. She was also named as one of the breakout stars of 2020 for film. Coel also appeared in British Vogue's 2020 list of influential women. Furthermore, in the 15th annual Powerlist of the most influential people of African or African-Caribbean heritage in the United Kingdom, Coel was ranked fourth for the impact of her work on I May Destroy You.

In July 2021, Coel was cast in Black Panther: Wakanda Forever. She plays the role of Aneka, a member of the Dora Milaje.

Coel's first book, Misfits: a Personal Manifesto, was published simultaneously in the UK and the USA on 7 September 2021 by Ebury Press. Based on her MacTaggart lecture at 2018's Edinburgh Festival, which touches on Coel's experiences with racism and misogyny, her publisher described the book as "a powerful manifesto on how speaking your truth and owning your differences can transform your life".

Personal life
At the 2016 BAFTA Awards, Coel wore a dress, designed by her mother, made of Kente cloth. She has said that, like her Chewing Gum character Tracey, she became very religious in the Pentecostal faith and embraced celibacy. Coel stopped practising Pentecostalism after attending Guildhall. She identifies as aromantic.

Filmography

Film

Television

Stage

Discography
EP
22 May (2007)
LPs
Fixing Barbie (2009)
We're the Losers (2011)

Awards and nominations

Works and publications

References

External links
 
 
 Michaela Coel's James MacTaggart Lecture at Edinburgh TV Festival 2018

Living people
1987 births
20th-century British LGBT people
21st-century British actresses
21st-century LGBT people
Actresses from London
Alumni of the Guildhall School of Music and Drama
Aromantic women
Best Actress BAFTA Award (television) winners
Best Female Comedy Performance BAFTA Award (television) winners
Black British women writers
Black British women comedians
Black British actresses
British film actresses
British people of Ghanaian descent
British stage actresses
British television actresses
British television writers
British women dramatists and playwrights
British women poets
Former Pentecostals
People from Aldgate
LGBT actresses
WFTV Award winners
British women television writers
21st-century British screenwriters
21st-century British women writers